The 2008 Miami Hurricanes baseball team represented the University of Miami in the 2008 NCAA Division I baseball season. The Hurricanes played their home games at Mark Light Field. The team was coached by Jim Morris in his fifteenth season at Miami.  Playing in the Atlantic Coast Conference's Coastal Division, they finished in first place in their division with a record of 23–5, 53–11 overall.

The Hurricanes reached the College World Series, where they finished tied for fifth after dropping an opening round game against eventual runner-up Georgia, defeating Florida State, and being eliminated by semifinalist Stanford.

Personnel

Roster

Coaches

Schedule and results

References

Miami Hurricanes baseball seasons
Miami Hurricanes
Atlantic Coast Conference baseball champion seasons
College World Series seasons
Miami
Miami Hurricanes baseball